Moundou Airport  is an airport serving Moundou, the second largest city in Chad and the capital of the region of Logone Occidental.

Facilities 

References

External links
 
 

Airports in Chad
Logone Occidental Region
Moundou